This is a list of aircraft in alphabetical order beginning with 'Li' through 'Lz'.

Li–Lz

Liaoning Ruixiang
(Liaoning Ruixiang General Aviation Manufacture Company Limited, Shenyang, China)
Liaoning Ruixiang RX1E

Liberty 

(Liberty Airship Co (Pres: D H Felton), Muskogee, OK)
 Liberty 1918 airship

Liberty 

(Liberty Aircraft Co, Kansas City, KS )
 Liberty 1931 Aeroplane

Liberty 

(Liberty Aircraft Sales & Mfg Co, Lambert Field, Robertson, MO)
 Liberty P-2 (a.k.a. Liberty A)

Liberty 

(O N Lloyd, Mesa AZ; aka Mesa Air Development Assn.)
 Liberty Sport A

Liberty 

(Liberty Aerospace, Melbourne, FL)
 Liberty XL-2

Liberty Bell 

(1928: Midwest Aircraft Corp, St Cloud MN. 1928: North Star Aircraft Corp (Fdr: Willard Hoseas Mohlar))
 Liberty Bell 100-HM4a

LIBIS 

(Letalski Institut Branko Ivanus Slovenija)
 LIBIS LK-1 
 LIBIS KB-6 Matajur
 LIBIS KB-11 Branko
 LIBIS 160
 LIBIS 180

Lift Systems 

(Lift Systems Inc.)
 Lift Systems LS-3

Lige 

(Eugene H Lige, Auburn, IN)
 Lige Sport

Ligeti

(Ligeti aero-Nautical Pty. Ltd.)
 Ligeti Startos

Light 

(Light Aircraft Developers, San Diego, CA)
 Light F-15

Light Miniature Aircraft 

(Light Miniature Aircraft, Okeechobee, FL)
 Light Miniature Aircraft LM-1
 Light Miniature Aircraft LM-2
 Light Miniature Aircraft LM-3
 Light Miniature Aircraft LM-5
 Light Miniature Aircraft LM-J3-W
 Light Miniature Aircraft LM-TC-W

Light Wing 

(Light Wing AG Aircraft, Stans, Switzerland)
Light Wing AC4

Lightning Bug 

(Lightning Bug Aircraft Corp, Sheldon, SC)
 Lightning Bug 199? Monoplane

Lightsey 

(Mark A Lightsey, aka AeroCraftsman Replicas, Rubidoux, CA)
 Lightsey Caudron C.460

Lightwing 

(John M. Lee)
 Lightwing Rooster

Lignel 

(Jean Lignel)(see:SFCA)

Ligreau 

(G. Ligreau)
 Ligreau GL.4

Likosiak 

(Cazimir Likosiak, 7508 Kenwood Ave, Chicago, IL)
 Likosiak 1926 Biplane

Lilienthal 

 Derwitzer Glider

Lilienthal Aviation 

(Ukraine)
 Lilienthal X-32 Bekas

Likosiak 

((Max T) Lillie School of Aviation, Cicero, IL)
 Lillie Tractor

Lilium 
 Lilium Jet

Limbach 

(Gus Limbach)
 Limbach Gusty

Linburg 

(Vincent J Linburg, St Louis, MO)
 Linburg Special

Lincoln-Flagg 

 Lincoln-Flagg-1

Lincoln-Page 

(1920: Nebraska Aircraft, Lincoln, NE, 1923: Lincoln-Standard Aircraft Co. c.1925: Lincoln-(Ray) Page Aircraft Co. 1928: Reorganized as Lincoln Aircraft Co. 1930: Merger of Lincoln and American Eagle operations as (Victor H) Roos Lincoln Aircraft Co, Lincoln, NE)
 Lincoln AP All-Purpose
 Lincoln J-1 Sport
 Lincoln-Page LP-3
 Lincoln-Page PT
 Lincoln AP
 Lincoln-Standard Cabin Cruiser (a.k.a. Lincoln-Standard HS)
 LincolnStandard J-1 Speedster
 LincolnStandard J-2
 LincolnStandard LS-2 Sportplane
 LincolnStandard LS-5
 Lincoln-Standard Raceabout
 Lincoln-Standard Sport
 Roos Lincoln Playboy

Lindsay (aviator) 

 lindsay 1909 Biplane

Lindsey 

(Ray Lindsey, Portland, OR)
 Lindsey 1967 Monoplane

Linke-Hofmann 

 Linke-Hofmann R.I
 Linke-Hofmann R.II

Linn 

(Charles C Linn, Lancaster, CA)
 Linn Mini-Mustang

Lion 

(Lion Airplane Co, Portland, OR)
 Lion A

Lioré 

(Fernand Lioré)
 Lioré No.1 1908
 Lioré No.2 1910

Lioré et Olivier 
(Fernand Lioré et Henri Olivier)
 Lioré et Olivier LeO 1
 Lioré et Olivier LeO 2
 Lioré et Olivier LeO 3 
 Lioré et Olivier LeO 4
 Lioré et Olivier LeO 4/1
 Lioré et Olivier LeO 4bis
 Lioré et Olivier LeO 5
 Lioré et Olivier LeO H-6
 Lioré et Olivier LeO H-6/2
 Lioré et Olivier LeO 7
 Lioré et Olivier LeO 8
 Lioré et Olivier LeO 9
 Lioré et Olivier LeO H-10
 Lioré et Olivier LeO 11
 Lioré et Olivier LeO 12
 Lioré et Olivier LeO H-13
 Lioré et Olivier LeO H-14
 Lioré et Olivier LeO H-150
 Lioré et Olivier LeO H-151
 Lioré et Olivier LeO H-152
 Lioré et Olivier LeO H-16 to STAe spec. HB.4
 Lioré et Olivier LeO H-180
 Lioré et Olivier LeO H-181
 Lioré et Olivier LeO H-182
 Lioré et Olivier LeO H-190
 Lioré et Olivier LeO 20
 Lioré et Olivier LeO H-20
 Lioré et Olivier LeO 21
 Lioré et Olivier LeO H-22
 Lioré et Olivier LeO H-221
 Lioré et Olivier LeO H-23
 Lioré et Olivier LeO H-232
 Lioré et Olivier LeO H-24
 Lioré et Olivier LeO H-246
 Lioré et Olivier LeO 25
 Lioré et Olivier LeO H-27
 Lioré et Olivier LeO 300
 Lioré et Olivier LeO 301
 Lioré et Olivier LeO 40
 Lioré et Olivier LeO 41
 Lioré et Olivier LeO H-42
 Lioré et Olivier LeO H-43
 Lioré et Olivier LeO H-44
 Lioré et Olivier LeO 45
 Lioré et Olivier LeO H-46
 Lioré et Olivier LeO H-47
 Lioré et Olivier LeO 48
 Lioré et Olivier LeO H-49
 Lioré et Olivier LeO 50
 Lioré et Olivier LeO CL-10
 Lioré et Olivier LeO CL-11
 Lioré et Olivier LeO C-30
 Lioré et Olivier LeO C-30A/S
 Lioré et Olivier LeO C-301
 Lioré et Olivier LeO C-302
 Lioré et Olivier LeO C-34

LIPNUR 

(Lembaga Industri Penerbangan Nurtanio - Nurtanio Aviation Industry Body)
 LIPNUR LT-200 Angkatang
 LIPNUR Belalang
 LIPNUR Kindjeng
 LIPNUR Kolentang
 LIPNUR Kumbang
 LIPNUR Kunang-kunang
 LIPNUR Manyang
 LIPNUR Sikumbang
 LIPNUR Super Kunang

Lippisch 

 Lippisch DM.1
 Lippisch Storch I
 Lippisch Storch II
 Lippisch Storch III
 Lippisch Storch IV
 Lippisch Storch V
 Lippisch Storch VI
 Lippisch Storch VII
 Lippisch Storch VIII
 Lippisch Storch IX
 Lippisch-Espenlaub E-2
 Lippisch Ente
 Lippisch Delta I
 Lippisch Delta II
 Lippisch Delta III
 Lippisch Delta IV
 Lippisch Delta V
 Lippisch Delta VI
 Lippisch P.01-111, designed as a competitor to the Messerschmitt Me 163 Komet.
 Lippisch Li P.04-106, a tailless airplane designed as a competitor to the Messerschmitt Me 329
 Lippisch P.11, designed to compete with the Horten Ho-IX; the latter went on to become the Horten (Gotha) Ho-(Go-)229.
 Lippisch P.13 (not related to P.13a and P.13b)
 Lippisch P.13a, a unique delta-winged, ramjet-powered interceptor.
 Lippisch P.13b, a unique airplane powered by a rotating fuel-table of lignite, owing to the fuel shortages late in World War 2 in Germany.
 Lippisch P.15, a development of the Messerschmitt Me 163 Komet.
 Lippisch X-112
 Lippisch X-113
 Lippisch X-114
 Lippisch X-117

LISA 
(LISA Aeronautics)
 LISA Akoya

Lisch 

(Fred J Lisch, 258 Blackman, Clinton, IN)
 Lisch 1930 Biplane

Lisunov 

 Lisunov Li-2

LITECOo 

 LITECO Atlas

LiteWing Aircraft 

(Caryville, Tennessee, United States)
LiteWing Aircraft LiteTrike
LiteWing Aircraft LiteWing

Little Wing Autogyros, Inc. 

 Little Wing Autogyro
 Little Wing LW-1 Original proof of concept prototype
 Little Wing LW-2 Single place autogyro designed to weigh less than 254 lbs to meet United States Ultralight regulations
 Little Wing LW-3 A 70 hp covered version
 Little Wing LW-4 A two place long frame version
 Little Wing LW-5 A two place short frame version
 Little Wing Roto-Pup

Littoral

(Littoral / Abel Triou)
 Littoral E-111

Liuchow 

(Liuchow Mechanical and Aircraft Factory )
 Liuchow Kwangsi Type 2
 Laville PS-89
 Liuchow Kwangsi Type 3

Livesey
(David Livesey)
 Livesey D.L.5

Livingston 

(Eugene Livingston, Charlotte, NC)(aka Gene Livingston)
 Livingston 1950 Biplane
 Livingston HN Double Eagle

LKL
(Lubelski Klub Lotniczy (Lublian Aviation Club))
 LKL I
 LKL II

LKOD 

(Liepajas Military Manufacturing) - Latvia
 LKOD KOD-1
 LKOD KOD-2
 LKOD KOD-3 - designed by Jacobs Kruze
 LKOD KOD-4 designed by Kruze and/or Atis Strazdins]
 LKOD SA-10 unlicensed copy of Svenska Aero SA-10 Piraten

Lloyd 

(Ungarische Lloyd Flugzeug und Motorenfabrik AG) / (Magyar Lloyd Repülőgép és motorgyár Részvény-Társaság)

Company designations

 Lloyd B
 Lloyd C
 Lloyd FJ (Flugzeug Jäger)
 Lloyd KF 1 (Kampfflugzeug)
 Lloyd KF 2
 Lloyd LK I (Luftkreuzer)
 Lloyd LK II
 Lloyd LS 1 (built at DFW in Germany)
 Lloyd LS 2 (40.02 / Lloyd Ll 2S / Lloyd Militär Doppeldecker Nr.2) (built at DFW in Germany)

Military designations

 Lloyd C.I
 Lloyd C.II
 Lloyd C.III
 Lloyd C.IV
 Lloyd C.V
 Lloyd D.I (proposed series 45 fighter, modified 40.05)
Note: As with other austro-Hungarian aircraft manufacturers in World War I Lloyd were allocated the 40 series for prototypes and experimental aircraft.

Flars series numbers

 Lloyd 40.01 (Lloyd LS 1)
 Lloyd 40.02 (Lloyd LS 2)
 Lloyd 40.03
 Lloyd 40.04
 Lloyd 40.05
 Lloyd 40.06
 Lloyd 40.07
 Lloyd 40.08 Luftkreuzer
 Lloyd 40.09
 Lloyd 40.10
 Lloyd 40.11
 Lloyd 40.12
 Lloyd 40.13
 Lloyd 40.14
 Lloyd 40.15
 Lloyd 40.16
 Lloyd 40.17
 Lloyd 40.18
 Lloyd 40.19
 Lloyd 40.20
 Lloyd series 41 (C.I)
 Lloyd series 42 (C.II)
 Lloyd series 43 (C.III)
 Lloyd series 44 (C.IV)
 Lloyd series 44.2 (C.IV)
 Lloyd series 44.4 (C.IV)
 Lloyd series 45 (D.I)
 Lloyd series 46 (C.V)
 Lloyd series 46.5 (C.V)
 Lloyd series 47 (Aviatik C.I(Ll))
 Lloyd series 48 (Aviatik D.I(Ll))
 Lloyd series 49 (Phőnix C.I(Ll))
 Lloyd series 248 (Aviatik D.I(Ll))
 Lloyd series 348 (Aviatik D.I(Ll))

LMAASA
(Lockheed martin Aircraft Argentina SA)
 LMAASA IA 63 Pampa NG

LO 
 LO 120 S

Load Ranger 
 LoadRanger 2000

Lobet de Rouvray 
(Lobet de Rouvray Aviation Pty. Ltd. / James Lobet & William Lobet)
 Lobet Ganagobie

Lockheed 
(Lockheed Corporation)
(Older name before Lockheed:Detroit)

 Lockheed Project Isinglass
 Lockheed A-9
 Lockheed A-12
 Lockheed A-28 Hudson
 Lockheed A-29 Hudson
 Lockheed AMSS (S-3 derivative)
 Lockheed AT-18
 Lockheed B-21 Raider Bomber
 Lockheed B-30
 Lockheed B-34 Lexington
 Lockheed B-37 Lexington
 Lockheed RB-69A Neptune
 Lockheed C-5 Galaxy
 Lockheed C-12 Vega
 Lockheed C-17 Super Vega
 Lockheed C-23 Altair
 Lockheed C-25 Altair
 Lockheed C-35 Electra
 Lockheed C-36 Electra
 Lockheed C-37 Electra
 Lockheed C-40 Electra
 Lockheed C-56 Lodestar
 Lockheed C-57 Lodestar
 Lockheed C-59 Lodestar
 Lockheed C-60 Lodestar
 Lockheed C-63 Hudson
 Lockheed C-66 Lodestar
 Lockheed C-69 Constellation
 Lockheed C-85 Orion
 Lockheed C-101 Vega
 Lockheed C-111 Super Electra
 Lockheed C-121 Constellation
 Lockheed C-130 Hercules
 Lockheed C-140 Jetstar
 Lockheed C-141 Starlifter
 Lockheed CP-140 Aurora
 Lockheed CP-140A Arcturus
 Lockheed EC-121 Warning Star	
 Lockheed EC-130V Hercules
 Lockheed ER-2
 Lockheed F-4 Lightning
 Lockheed F-5 Lightning
 Lockheed F-12
 Lockheed F-14 Shooting Star
 Lockheed F-80 shooting Star
 Lockheed F-90
 Lockheed F-94 Starfire
 Lockheed F-97 Starfire
 Lockheed F-104 Starfighter
 Lockheed NF-104A
 Lockheed F-117A Nighthawk
 Lockheed FM-2
 Lockheed FO Lightning
 Lockheed FV Salmon
 Lockheed GV
 Lockheed H-51
 Lockheed AH-56 Cheyenne
 Lockheed JO Electra Junior
 Lockheed O-3
 Lockheed P-2 Neptune
 Lockheed P-3 Orion
 Lockheed P-3 Orion AEW&C
 Lockheed P-7
 Lockheed P-24
 Lockheed P-38 Lightning
 Lockheed P-49
 Lockheed P-58 Chain Lightning
 Lockheed P-80 Shooting Star
 Lockheed PB-3
 Lockheed PBO
 Lockheed PO Warning Star
 Lockheed PO-2W
 Lockheed PV-1 Ventura
 Lockheed PV-2 Harpoon
 Lockheed P2V Neptune
 Lockheed P3V Orion
 Lockheed RO Altair
 Lockheed R2O Electra
 Lockheed R3O Electra Junior
 Lockheed R4O Super Electra
 Lockheed R5O Lodestar
 Lockheed R6O Constitution
 Lockheed R6V Constitution
 Lockheed R7O Constellation
 Lockheed R7V Constellation
 Lockheed S-3 Viking
 Lockheed SR-71 Blackbird
 Lockheed T-1 Seastar
 Lockheed T-33 Shooting Star
 Lockheed T2V SeaStar
 Lockheed TO Shooting Star
 Lockheed TR-1
 Lockheed TV Shooting Star
 Lockheed U-2
 Lockheed UV
 Lockheed XV-4 Hummingbird
 Lockheed VZ-10 Hummingbird
 Lockheed WV Warning Star
 Lockheed WV-2
 Lockheed X-7
 Lockheed X-26 Frigate
 Lockheed X-27 Lancer
 Lockheed XP-900
 Lockheed YF-12
 Lockheed A-11 (A - Archangel - not military)
 Lockheed A-12 (A - Archangel - not military)
 Lockheed L-1 Vega
 Lockheed L-2 Vega
 Lockheed L-3 Air Express
 Lockheed L-4 Explorer
 Lockheed L-5 Vega
 Lockheed L-7 Explorer
 Lockheed L-8 Altair
 Lockheed L-8 Sirius
 Lockheed L-9 Orion
 Lockheed L-10 Electra
 Lockheed L-012 Electra Junior
 Lockheed L-212
 Lockheed L-014 Super Electra
 Lockheed B-14 (not US military designation)
 Lockheed L-414
 Lockheed L-018 Lodestar
 Lockheed L-022 Lightning
 Lockheed L-122 Lightning
 Lockheed L-222 Lightning
 Lockheed L-322 Lightning
 Lockheed L-422 Lightning
 Lockheed L-026 Neptune
 Lockheed L-126 Neptune
 Lockheed L-226 Neptune
 Lockheed L-326 Neptune
 Lockheed L-426 Neptune
 Lockheed L-526 Neptune
 Lockheed L-626 Neptune
 Lockheed L-726 Neptune
 Lockheed L-033 Little Dipper
 Lockheed L-034 Big Dipper
 Lockheed L-037 Ventura
 Lockheed L-049 Constellation
 Lockheed L-149 Constellation
 Lockheed L-549 Constellation
 Lockheed L-649 Constellation
 Lockheed L-749 Constellation
 Lockheed L-1049 Super Constellation
 Lockheed L-1249 Super Constellation
 Lockheed L-1649 Starliner
 Lockheed L-080 Shooting Star
 Lockheed L-780 Starfire
 Lockheed L-090
 Lockheed L-100 Hercules
 Lockheed L-133
 Lockheed L-140
 Lockheed L-141
 Lockheed L-186
 Lockheed L-188 Starfire
 Lockheed L-188 Electra
 Lockheed L-245
 Lockheed L-286
 Lockheed L-301
 Lockheed L-402
 Lockheed L-1011 TriStar
 Lockheed L-2000
 Lockheed Aerogyro
 Lockheed Air Express
 Lockheed Air Trooper
 Lockheed Altair
 Lockheed Big Dipper
 Lockheed CL-282
 Lockheed CL-288
 Lockheed CL-329 Jetstar
 Lockheed CL-400 Project Suntan
 Lockheed CL-475
 Lockheed CL-595 Aerogyro
 Lockheed CL-823
 Lockheed CL-915
 Lockheed CL-1200 Lancer
 Lockheed CL-1600
 Lockheed CL-1980
 Lockheed Big Dipper
 Lockheed Constellation
 Lockheed D-21
 Lockheed Electra (1930s)
 Lockheed Electra (1950s)
 Lockheed Electra Junior
 Lockheed Explorer
 Lockheed Flatbed
 Lockheed Have Blue
 Lockheed Hudson
 Lockheed JetStar
 Lockheed JetStar One
 Lockheed KXL1
 Lockheed Little Dipper
 Lockheed Lodestar
 Lockheed Martin CFO
 Lockheed Orion (1930s)
 Lockheed Orion (1960s)
 Lockheed Q-Star
 Lockheed QT-2
 Lockheed Saturn
 Lockheed Sirius
 Lockheed Starliner
 Lockheed Super Constellation
 Lockheed Super Dipper
 Lockheed Super Electra
 Lockheed TriStar
 Lockheed Vega
 Lockheed XFV
 Lockheed/Canadair CF-104 Starfighter Canadian Armed Forces
 Lockheed/Canadair CP-122 Neptune Canadian Armed Forces
 Lockheed/Canadair CP-140 Aurora Canadian Armed Forces
 Lockheed/Canadair CP-140A Arcturus Canadian Armed Forces
 Lockheed/Canadair CT-133 Silver Star Canadian Armed Forces
 Lockheed/Tachikawa Army Type LO Transport

Lockheed Martin 
 Lockheed Martin Aerial Common Sensor
 Lockheed Martin F-22 Raptor
 Lockheed Martin F-35 Lightning II
 Lockheed Martin RQ-3 Dark Star
 Lockheed Martin SR-72
 Lockheed Martin VentureStar
 Lockheed Martin X-33
 Lockheed Martin X-35
 Lockheed Martin X-44A UAV revealed March 2018
 Lockheed Martin X-44 MANTA cancelled project (spoof designation)
 Lockheed Martin Polecat
 Lockheed Martin RQ-170 Sentinel Beast of Kandahar

Lockspeiser 
(Lockspeiser Aircraft Ltd. / David Lockspeiser)
 Lockspeiser LDA-01

Lockwood
 Lockwood Aircam
 Lockwood Drifter

Locomotive 
(Locomotive Terminal Improvement Co, Barrington, IL)
 Locomotive Chicago Javelin (a.k.a.Mulzer Locomotive)

Loehle 
(Loehle Enterprises, Wartrace, TN: Also Loehle Aviation Inc, Loehle Aircraft Corp.)
 Loehle 5151
 Loehle P-40
 Loehle Spitfire Elite
 Loehle Sport Parasol
 Loehle Spad XIII
 Loehle SE. 5a
 Loehle Fokker D.VII

Loening 
(1913: Grover Loening. 1917: Loening Aeronautical Engineering Co, 31 St at East River, New York, NY, 1928: Merged with Keystone Aircraft Corp as Loening Aeronautical Div. 1929: Loening Aeronautical Engineering Co, Garden City, NY)
 Loening COA-1
 Loening FL USN fighter cancelled
 Loening HL
 Loening LS
 Loening O-10
 Loening OA-1
 Loening OA-2
 Loening OL
 Loening O2L
 Loening PA-1 "pursuit Air-cooled"
 Loening PW-2 "pursuit Water-cooled"
 Loening R-4
 Loening SL
 Loening S2L
 Loening-Milling 1912
 Loening 1911 monoplane flying boat
 Loening 1917
 Loening S-1 (Air Yacht 1922)
 Loening Amphibian 1923
 Loening C-1
 Loening C-2 (Air Yacht 1928)
 Loening C-4
 Loening C-5
 Loening C-6
 Loening Duckling 1918
 Loening Duckling 1929
 Loening M-1
 Loening M-2 Kitten
 Loening M-3
 Loening M-8
 Loening M-8-0
 Loening M-8-1
 Loening Monoduck

Lofland 

(W J Lofland Aircraft Co, Detroit, MI)
 Lofland 1931 Biplane

Logistik-Technik 
(Logistik-Technik u. Design GmbH (known as LTD), Baindt, Germany)
LTD LO-120S

Lohner 
(Lohnerwerke GmbH / Jakob Lohner)
 Lohner AA (10.20 / 111)
 Lohner AB (112)
 Lohner AC (10.23)
 Lohner A (111.04 / Dr.I)
 Lohner B
 Lohner C
 Lohner D
 Lohner E
 Lohner G
 Lohner H
 Lohner H2
 Lohner J
 Lohner Jc
 Lohner Jcr
 Lohner L (L40-L45)
 Lohner M Rennboot Nordenflug (E17-E21, L16)
 Lohner MK (M31, M39)
 Lohner Mkn (R1-R2)
 Lohner Mn bzw.M2	(E33-E38)
 Lohner P (R28-R30, S.1-S.6)
 Lohner R	(R1-R29) 1918
 Lohner S
 Lohner T (L5, L46-L51, L52-L57) 1915 
 Lohner Te	L58-L69, L90-L119) 1916
 Lohner TI	(L120-L143, R1-R24, R25-R48) 1916
 Lohner U
 Lohner X	(K300) 1916
 Lohner Z
 Lohner B.I (series 11)
 Lohner B.II
 Lohner B.III
 Lohner B.IV
 Lohner B.V
 Lohner B.VI
 Lohner B.VII
 Lohner C.I
 Lohner C.II
 Lohner Dr.I (Lohner 111.04 / Type A / 10.20)
 Lohner D.I (Lohner 111 / Type AA / 10.20)
Note: The Lohner 10 series is mostly composed of distinct aircraft, with several variants and prototypes of the Pfeilflieger.
 Lohner 10.01
 Lohner 10.02
 Lohner 10.03
 Lohner 10.04
 Lohner 10.05
 Lohner 10.06
 Lohner 10.07
 Lohner 10.08 re-designated Taube
 Lohner 10.09 re-designated Taube
 Lohner 10.10 re-designated Taube
 Lohner 10.10 new Pfeilflieger
 Lohner 10.11 re-designated Taube
 Lohner 10.12 formerly Gebirgsflieger Type C
 Lohner 10.13 second gebirgsflieger
 Lohner 10.14 formerly Meeting Apparat 1914
 Lohner 10.15 Schichtpreis Eindecker Type 1914
 Lohner 10.16
 Lohner 10.17
 Lohner 10.18
 Lohner 10.19 (Lohner C.II series 112.01)
 Lohner 10.20A (Lohner D.I / series 111 / Type AA) SPUCKERL?
 Lohner 10.20B (Lohner D.I / series 111 / Type AA) SPUCKERL?
 Lohner 10.21 (Type U) (formerly Type U twin engined bomber)
 Lohner 10.21 (Type F) Ferkundungs Flugzeug
 Lohner 10.22 second Ferkundungs Flugzeug
 Lohner 10.23 (Type AC)
 Lohner 10.28
 Lohner series 11 (Lohner B.I / Type B)
 Lohner series 12 (Lohner B.II / Type C)
 Lohner series 12.4 (Lohner B.II(U))
 Lohner series 13 (Lohner B.III / Type D)
 Lohner series 14 (Lohner B.III / Type E)
 Lohner series 14.5 (Lohner B.III(U))
 Lohner series 15 (Lohner B.IV / Type G)
 Lohner series 15.5 (Lohner B.IV(U))
 Lohner series 16 (Lohner B.V / Type H)
 Lohner series 16.1 (Lohner B.VI / Type H2)
 Lohner series 17 (Lohner B.VII / Type J)
 Lohner series 17.3 (Lohner B.VII)
 Lohner series 17.5 (Lohner B.VII(U))
 Lohner series 17.8 (Lohner B.VII / re-engined series 17 aircraft)
 Lohner series 18 (Lohner C.I / Type Jc)
 Lohner series 18.5 (Lohner C.I / Type Jcr)
 Lohner series 111 (Lohner D.I / Type AA / 10.20)
 Lohner series 112 (Lohner C.II / Type AB)
 Lohner-Etrich Renn Gebirgs (racer-mountain) (AD 127 and AD 354)
 Lohner-Daimler 1910 Pfeilflieger Pfeilflieger (arrow flier)
 Lohner-Daimler 1911 Pfeilflieger
 Lohner 1912 Pfeilflieger
 Lohner 1913 Pfeilflieger
 Lohner Parasol (AD 426)
 Lohner Marineflieger III
 Lohner Warnemunde	(L32) (Others have this as a Model 'T')
 Lohner Nr5 (L.5) 1913	 
 Lohner Nr6	 
 Lohner Etrich/Mickl (E16)

Loire 
(Ateliers et Chantiers de la Loire)
 Loire 11
 Loire 30
 Loire 40 1928 C.1
 Loire 41 1928 C.1
 Loire 42 1928 C.1
 Loire 43
 Loire 45
 Loire 46
 Loire 50
 Loire 60
 Loire 70
 Loire 102 Bretagne
 Loire 130
 Loire 210
 Loire 250
 Loire 301
 Loire 501
 Loire 601

Loire-Nieuport 
 Loire-Nieuport LN.10 - twin engine floatplane (1939)
 Loire-Nieuport LN.140
 Loire-Nieuport LN.161
 Loire-Nieuport LN.40
 Loire-Nieuport LN.41
 Loire-Nieuport LN.401
 Loire-Nieuport LN.402
 Loire-Nieuport LN.411
 Loire-Nieuport LN.42

Lombarda 
(Aeronautica Lombarda S.A.)
 Lombarda A.L. 12P
 Lombarda A.L.T.
 Pedaliante B.B. (Bossi-Bonomi HPA)

Lombardi 
(Francis Lombardi) - (Azionaria Vercellese Industrie Aeronautiche q.v.) 
 Lombardi FL.3
 Lombardi L.4
 Lombardi LM.5
 Lombardi LM.7

London and Provincial 
(London and Provincial Aviation Company)
 London and Provincial Fuselage Biplane
 London and Provincial School Biplane

Lonek
(Jaroslav Lonek)
 Lonek L-1 lump
 Lonek L-4
 Lonek L-5
 Lonek L-8 Ginette

Long 
(Leslie Long, Cornelius and Beaverton, OR)
 Long Anzani Longster (a.k.a.AL-1)
 Long Henderson Longster (a.k.a.HL-1)
 Long Low-Wing Longster

Long 
(David E Long, Lock Haven, PA)
 Long Midget Mustang

Long-Ralston 
(Leslie Long & "Swede" Ralston, Cornelius, OR)
 Long-Ralston Wimpy (a.k.a. W)

Longfellow
(Longfellow Monoplane Company, Allston, Boston, MA)
 Longfellow 1911 monoplane (Bleriot type) powered by an Avis 30 hp., 2 cyl., 2 cycle revolving engine with a weight of 79 lbs.

Longmire 
(D Lev Longmire, Albuquerque, NM)
 Longmire Model A
 Longmire Shady Lady

Longren 
(1911: Albin K. Longren. 1920: Longren Aircraft Co, Cessna Airport, Topeka, KS, 1924: Filed bankruptcy, sold rights and equipment to Alexander Film Co. 1939: Longren Aircraft Co, Torrance, CA)
 Longren 1912 Biplane
 Longren 1914 Biplane
 Longren 1916 Biplane
 Longren AK (a.k.a. Fibre sport Plna or New longren Sport or Commercial - USAAS Longren L-3)
 Longren D-2
 Longren G
 Longren H (H-2)
 Longren H-2
 Longren LH
 Longren LAK
 Longren NL-13
 Longren Topeka

Longren 
(Longren Aircraft Co, Torrance, CA)
 Longren Centaur

Lookout Mountain Flight Park 
(Rising Fawn, GA)
Lookout Mountain SkyCycle

Looney 
(William E Looney, Detroit, MI)
 Looney Welco

Loose 
(George H Loose Co, Redwood City, CA)
 Loose 1909 Monoplane
 Loose 1910 Monoplane
 Loose 1911 Biplane

Loose 
(Chester Loose, Davenport, IA)
 Loose 1930 Monoplane
 Loose 1933 Monoplane
 Loose Racer
 Loose Special
 Loose-Siem Special (a.k.a. Townsend Special)

LoPresti 
(Curt and Jim LoPresti )
 LoPresti Sharkfire

LoPresti 
(LeRoy P LoPresti. LoPresti-Piper Aircraft Engr Co, Vero Beach, FL)
 LoPresti LP-1 Swiftfury
 LoPresti Swiftfire

Loral 
 Loral GZ-22

Loravia 
 Loravai KV.2
 Loravai KV.3A
 Loravai KV.4
 Loravai KV.5

Loring 
(Talleres Loring / Dr. Jorge Loring)
 Loring Reconocimiento (1919)
 Loring R-I
 Loring R-II
 Loring R-III
 Loring C.I
 Loring B.I
 Loring T.I
 Loring E.II La Pepa
 Loring-Barrón Colonial Trimotor
 Loring X

Lorraine Hanriot 
See: Hanriot

Loudenclos 
(Edward Loudenclos, San Francisco, CA)
 Loudenclos 1912 Biplane
 Loudenclos 1912 Monoplane

Loudenslager
(Leo Loudenslager)
 Loudenslager Laser 200

Loughead 
(Alco (Alco Cab Co, principal investor) Hydroaeroplane Co, San Francisco, CA, 1916: (Allan and Malcolm) Loughead Aircraft Mfg Co, Santa Barbara, CA)
 Loughead F-1
 Loughead G
 Loughead HS-2L1
 Loughead S-1 Sport

Lovejoy
(D. Barr Peat and Kenneth “Curly” Lovejoy)
 Lovejoy Curlycraft (Heinz backed)

Loveland 
(A D Loveland, Milwaukee, WI)
 Loveland Experimental

Loving 
(Neal Loving, Wayne University, Detroit, MI)
 Loving WR-1 Love
 Loving WR-2

Lowe 
 Lowe Marlburian

L.T.G. 
(Luft Torpedo Gesellschaft)
 L.T.G. SD 1
 L.T.G. FD 1

LTV 
(1960: Merger of Ling Electronics and TEMCO as Ling-Temco Electronics Inc. 1961: Merged with Chance Vought Corp as Ling-Temco-Vought Inc. 1965: LTV Aerospace. 1976: Vought Corp. 1986: LTV Aircraft Products Group. 1990: LTV Aerospace and Defense Co. )
 LTV A-7 Corsair II
 LTV C-142
 LTV L450F

Lualdi-Tassotti 
See:Aer Lualdi

Lübeck-Travemünde 
(Flugzeugwerft Lübeck-Travemünde G.m.b.H.)
 Lübeck-Travemünde F 1
 Lübeck-Travemünde F 2
 Lübeck-Travemünde F 4
 Lübeck-Travemünde No. 844

Lublin (Plage i Laśkiewicz) 

(Zaklady Mechaniczne E.Plage i T. Laśkiewicz - E.Plage & T.Laśkiewicz Engineering Establishment)
 Lublin R-VIII
 Lublin R-IX
 Lublin R-X
 Lublin R-XI
 Lublin R-XII
 Lublin R-XIII
 Lublin R-XIV
 Lublin R-XVI
 Lublin R-XVII
 Lublin R-XVIII
 Lublin R-XX

Lucas 
(Avions Émile Lucas, Lagny-le-Sec, France)
 Lucas L4 Baby Lucas
 Lucas L5
 Lucas L6
 Lucas L6A
 Lucas L6B
 Lucas L6-7
 Lucas L7
 Lucas L8
 Lucas L10
 Lucas L11
 Lucas L12

Ludington 
(1922: Ludington Exhibition Co (founders: Charles Townsend Ludington & Wallace Kellett), Pine Valley, NJ, 1926: Ludington Philadelphia Flying Service, Philadelphia, PA)
 Ludington Farman Sport
 Ludington Chamberlain Biplane
 Ludington Miller Lizette

Ludington-Griswold 
((C Townsend) Ludington - (Roger) Griswold Aircraft Co, CT)
 Ludington-Griswold 1944 two-seater Monoplane
 Ludington-Griswold 1944 four-seater Monoplane

Ludlow 
(Israel Ludlow, Jamestown, OH or Norfolk, VA)
 Ludlow 1905 Biplane
 Ludlow 1907 Aeroplane
 Ludlow 1908 Aeroiplane
 Ludlow Multiplane

Lundgren 
(Earl Lundgren. )
 Lundgren 1911 Monoplane

Lundy-Kotula 
(Brian Lundy & Steve Kotula, Salt Lake City/Midwale, UT)
 Lundy-Kotula Graflite

Luscombe 
(Luscombe Airplane Co, Kansas City MO)
 Luscombe 1 Phantom
 Luscombe 4
 Luscombe 8 Silvaire (a.k.a.Silvaire-Luscombe 8F a.k.a. TEMCO Luscombe 8F)
 Luscombe 9
 Luscombe 10
 Luscombe 11A Silvaire Sedan
 Luscombe 50
 Luscombe 90
 Luscombe C-90
 Luscombe Gullwing (aka Weatherly-Campbell Colt or Wiggins Colt 460)
 Luscombe Phantom
 Luscombe Sixty-Five
 Luscombe Sprite

Luscombe 
(Luscombe Aircraft (Pres: John Daniel), Altus, OK)
 Luscombe 11E Spartan

Lush 
 Lush VVA-1

Luton 
(Luton Aircraft)
 Luton L.A.2
 Luton L.A.3 Minor
 Luton L.A.4 Minor
 Luton L.A.5 Major
 Luton Buzzard

Luyties 
(Otto Luyties)
 luyties 1907 Helicopter

LVG 
(Luft-Verkehrs Gesellschaft m.b.H. Johannisthal)
LVG B.I
LVG B.II
LVG B.III
LVG C.I
LVG C.II
LVG C.III
LVG C.IV
LVG C.V
LVG C.VI
LVG C.VIII
LVG C.IX
LVG C.VIII
LVG D.II
LVG D.III
LVG D.IV
LVG D.V
LVG D.VI
LVG E.I
LVG G.I
LVG G.II
LVG G.III
LVG W.I
LVG D 4
LVG D 10
LVG D 12 (D.II)
LVG P.I
LVG P.II
LVG D 12

LWD 
(Lotnicze Warsztaty Doświadczalne - experimental aviation workshops)
 LWD Junak
 LWD Junak-3
 LWD Żak
 LWD Szpak-4
 LWD Żuraw
 LWD Zuch
 LWD Bies
 LWD Goniec
 LWD Miś
 LWD Skrzat
 LWD Upiór

LWF 
(1915: Lowe, Willard & Fowler Engineering Company (Robert G Fowler, Edward Lowe Jr, Charles Willard), Long Island, NY, then College Point, NY, 1916: Reorganized, after principals had left, by New York City investment company as L-W-F Engineering Co Inc.)
 LWF Butterfly
 LWF SDW-1 (Douglas DT-2 / Wright SDW-1)
 LWF model F
 LWF model G
 LWF model G-2
 LWF HS-2L (Curtiss HS-2L)
 LWF Model H Owl
 LWF model J-2 (Twin DH)
 LWF MO-1
 LWF NBS-1
 LWF NBS-2
 LWF Reconnaissance
 LWF T-3
 LWF model V

LWS 
(Lubelska Wytwórnia Samolotów - Lublin aircraft factory)
 LWS-1
 LWS-2
 LWS-3 Mewa
 LWS-4
 LWS-5
 LWS-6 Żubr
 LWS-7 Mewa II

References

Further reading

External links

 List Of Aircraft (Li)

fr:Liste des aéronefs (I-M)